Dernelle L. Mascall (born 20 October 1988) is a Trinidadian footballer midfielder who plays for Grindavík.

International goals
Scores and results list Trinidad and Tobago' goal tally first.

References

External links 
 

1988 births
Living people
Women's association football midfielders
Trinidad and Tobago women's footballers
People from Princes Town region
Trinidad and Tobago women's international footballers
Pan American Games competitors for Trinidad and Tobago
Footballers at the 2011 Pan American Games
Footballers at the 2015 Pan American Games
College women's soccer players in the United States
University of Mobile alumni
West Florida Argonauts women's soccer players
Dernelle Mascall
Trinidad and Tobago expatriate women's footballers
Trinidad and Tobago expatriate sportspeople in the United States
Expatriate women's soccer players in the United States
Trinidad and Tobago expatriates in Iceland
Expatriate women's footballers in Iceland